Banamali Babu (9 March 1918 - 30 November 1998)  was an Indian politician, belonging to the Indian National Congress. He was elected to the 5th Lok Sabha the lower house of Indian Parliament from Sambalpur in  Odisha.

References

External links
Official biographical sketch in Parliament of India website

India MPs 1971–1977
Odisha politicians
Lok Sabha members from Odisha
1918 births
1998 deaths
Rajya Sabha members from Odisha
Indian National Congress politicians
Indian National Congress politicians from Odisha